Submarine cable disruption may refer to:

 2008 submarine cable disruption
 2011 submarine cable disruption